Wilfred Williams (born June 4, 1996) is a Liberian-born American professional soccer player who plays as a defender.

Career 
Williams began his college soccer career at the University of Memphis, before spending a year at Eastern Florida State College and a further two years at Oakland University.

While at college, Williams appeared for USL PDL sides Des Moines Menace, Charlotte Eagles and Myrtle Beach Mutiny.

On January 21, 2018, Williams was selected 82nd overall in the 2018 MLS SuperDraft by Sporting Kansas City. However, he wasn't signed by the club. Williams spent time with fourth-tier sides Detroit City FC in the  NPSL, and Des Moines Menace in the USL PDL.

In February 2019, Williams joined USL League One side Orlando City B.

Williams joined NISA club Oakland Roots in February 2020.

On August 31, 2020, Williams was signed by Chattanooga FC.

References

External links 
 
 
 Wilfred Williams at Oakland

1996 births
Living people
American people of Liberian descent
Soccer players from Tennessee
American soccer players
Association football defenders
Memphis Tigers men's soccer players
EFSC Titans men's soccer players
Oakland Golden Grizzlies men's soccer players
Des Moines Menace players
Charlotte Eagles players
Myrtle Beach Mutiny players
Detroit City FC players
Orlando City B players
Oakland Roots SC players
Chattanooga FC players
Sporting Kansas City draft picks
USL League One players
USL League Two players
National Independent Soccer Association players
United States men's youth international soccer players